Adrian Stoughton (1556–1614), of Stoughton, Surrey and West Stoke, near Chichester, Sussex, was an English politician.

He was the son of Thomas Stoughton, MP and the brother of Laurence Stoughton, MP. Educated at the Inner Temple, he was called to the bar in 1587. He was the Recorder of Chichester from 1600.

He was a Member (MP) of the Parliament of England for Haslemere in 1593 and for Chichester in 1597, 1601, 1604 and 1614.

He married c.1583, Mary, the daughter  of William Jordyn of Chitterne, Wiltshire, with whom he had 16 children, including 2 sons and 6 daughters.

References

1556 births
1614 deaths
People from Chichester
English MPs 1593
English MPs 1597–1598
English MPs 1601
English MPs 1604–1611
English MPs 1614